ASIC is a compiler and integrated development environment for a subset of the BASIC programming language. It was released for MS-DOS and compatible systems as shareware.  Written by Dave Visti of 80/20 Software, it was one of the few BASIC compilers legally available for download from BBSes. ASIC allows compiling to an EXE or COM file. A COM file for Hello world program is 360 bytes.

ASIC has little or no support for logical operators, control structures, and floating-point arithmetic.  These shortcomings resulted in the tongue-in-cheek motto, "ASIC: It's almost BASIC!"

Features 
ASIC is strongly impoverished in comparison with its contemporary BASICs. The features of ASIC are selected to make a program be easily and directly compiled into machine language. Thus, many language constructs of ASIC are equivalent to constructs of assembly language.

Expressions 
ASIC does not have the exponentiation operator ^.

ASIC does not have boolean operators (AND, OR, NOT etc.).

Input and Output 
PRINT's arguments must be a literal or variable.

 LOCATE row, column   Moves the text cursor to the position (column, row), where 0 ≤ column and 0 ≤ row. The position (0, 0) is the upper left corner.

Graphics 
 PSET (row,column),color  Turns on the pixel of the color color at position (column, row), where 0 ≤column and 0 ≤ row. The position (0, 0) is the upper left corner.

Control Structures

Decisions 
A boolean condition in IF may be only a comparison of numbers or strings, but not a comparison of combined expressions. 

After THEN, there may be a sequence of statements delimited by ELSE or ENDIF. An example:
IF X < 0 THEN
  PRINT "Negative"
ELSE
  PRINT "Non-negative"
ENDIF
Contrary to other BASICs, statements cannot be put between THEN and the end of the line.

An if-statement can realize the conditional jump. In this case, after THEN there may be a label.

Looping 
In FOR, after TO there may be only a number - literal or variable - but not a combined expression. The STEP clause does not exist in ASIC.

Branching 
In a GOTO statement, the label must be followed by a colon.

Subroutines 
In a GOSUB statement, the label must be followed by a colon.

BAS2ASI 
This utility, serving to convert GW-BASIC programs to ASIC syntax, in the version 5.0 does not support some GW-BASIC features. Examples:

STEP in the for loop is not converted. The program
10 FOR i=10 TO 1 STEP -1 
20 PRINT i
30 NEXT i
is converted into
	REM 10 FOR i=10 TO 1 STEP -1 
	FOR I@ = 10 TO 1 
		ASIC0@ = -1 -1 
		I@ = I@ + ASIC0@ 
		
		REM 20 PRINT i
		PRINT I@ 
		
		REM 30 NEXT i		REM 30 NEXT i		3:  Syntax error 

The exponentiation operator ^ is not converted. The program
10 a=2
20 b=a^10
30 PRINT b
is converted into
	REM 10 a=2
L10: 
	A@ = 2 
	
	REM 20 b=a^10
	2:  Syntax error

	REM 30 PRINT b	REM 30 PRINT b	3:  Syntax error

References

External links

ASIC 5.00 + Libraries + Linker
 Category:ASIC Tasks implemented in ASIC on rosettacode.org

BASIC programming language family